Gabriel Taapopi Senior Secondary School, also known as GT, is a governmental secondary school in Ongwediva in the Oshana Region of northern Namibia. The school opened its doors in 1988 and was officially inaugurated in 1989 by then SWAPO deputy education minister Buddy Wentworth. It is named after Gabriel Taapopi. Its principal is Eelu Sakaria. The school is one of the top performing schools in the country. It has around 800 learners and about 30 teachers. The school features a large computer laboratory, physical science and biology labs as well as sports grounds.

Sports and entertainment
The school has incorporated a wide range of sport activities in it is curricula. It is successfully involved in national sports competitions of netball and soccer. The school groomed good football players, like Benson Shilongo, Esko Kavela, Benjamen Hauwanga and Johannes Iithete.

References

Schools in Oshana Region
Ongwediva
Educational institutions established in 1988
Boarding schools in Namibia
1988 establishments in South West Africa